Dorsum kwaii is a moth of the family Erebidae first described by Michael Fibiger in 2011. It is found in northern, central western and central Thailand and southern Laos.

The wingspan is 10–12 mm. The head, patagia, anterior part of tegulae and the prothorax are black brown. The forewings are short and relatively narrow and the ground colour is beige towards the base and distally brown, with black-brown areas throughout. The basal part of the costa, costal part of the triangular medial area and the terminal area are black brown. The crosslines are indistinct and beige. The terminal line is indicated by black interveinal dots. The hindwing ground colour is grey with a discal spot. The abdomen is brown without dorsal tufts.

References

Micronoctuini
Moths described in 2011
Taxa named by Michael Fibiger